James M. Williams (April 14, 1948 – June 12, 2011) was an analog circuit designer and technical author who worked for the Massachusetts Institute of Technology (1968–1979), Philbrick, National Semiconductor (1979–1982) and Linear Technology Corporation (LTC) (1982–2011). He wrote over 350 publications relating to analog circuit design, including five books, 21 application notes for National Semiconductor, 62 application notes for Linear Technology, and over 125 articles for EDN Magazine.

Williams suffered a stroke on June 10 and died on June 12, 2011.

Bibliography (partial)

For a complete bibliography, see.

See also
Paul Brokaw
Barrie Gilbert
Howard Johnson (electrical engineer)
Bob Pease — analog electronics engineer, technical author, and colleague. Pease died in an automobile accident after leaving Williams' memorial.
Bob Widlar — pioneering analog integrated circuit designer, technical author, early consultant to Linear Technology Corporation
Building 20 — legendary MIT building where Jim Williams had a design lab early in his career

References

External links
Archive of EDN articles.
.
https://web.archive.org/web/20120319221312/http://www.centredaily.com/2011/06/15/2779140/linear-technology-staff-scientist.html
Linear Technology - Staff Scientist Jim Williams Remembered
Walker, Rob (2006). Interview with Bob Dobkin and Jim Williams (part of Stanford and the Silicon Valley Project). Recorded April 19, 2006.

American electrical engineers
Analog electronics engineers
Integrated circuits
1948 births
2011 deaths
American technology writers